Tu Tithe Me was an Indian television series that aired on Zee Marathi which is produced by Shashank Solanki. The series premiered on 16 April 2012 by replacing Arundhati.

Summary 
It is a story about difficulties of married life. Manjiri and Satyajeet face a lot of ups and downs in their love life. The way they tackle through all of the problems is the main twist.

Cast 
 Chinmay Mandlekar as Satyajeet Mudholkar
 Mrunal Dusanis as Manjiri Satyajeet Mudholkar
 Priya Marathe as Priya Mohite
 Milind Shinde as Dada Holkar
 Vandana Sardesai-Waknis as Satyajeet's mother
 Angad Mhaskar as Vihang Bhosale
 Shreya Bugade as Manjusha Holkar, Dada's wife
 Ramesh Bhatkar as Manjiri's father
 Vidya Karanjikar as Manjiri's mother
 Rajshri Nikam as Satyajeet's Aatya
 Nikhil Raut as Ashish
 Kshitee Jog as Advocate of Satyajeet
 Neha Shitole as Netra, Gaurang's wife
 Amol Shirole as Gaurang Mudholkar, Satyajeet's brother
 Sharvani Pillai as Manjiri's aunt
 Amol Kolhe as Swapnil Wadekar
 Pratibha Goregaonkar
 Ajay Purkar

Awards

References

External links 
 
 

2012 Indian television series debuts
2014 Indian television series endings
Marathi-language television shows
Zee Marathi original programming